(born May 19, 1968) is a Japanese former mixed martial artist who competed in the light heavyweight division. He has fought for Shooto, Fighting Network RINGS, K-1, Pride Fighting Championships and the UFC.

Career
Honma had his first mixed martial arts fight on May 12, 1990, competing for the Shooto organisation in Japan. Honma compiled a record 3-3-2 in Shooto, including a victory over Manabu Yamada. He lost to Rene Rooze in his K-1 debut in 1995. On October 11, 1998, Honma made his Pride FC debut at Pride 4. Honma beat Naoki Sano by TKO. On June 6, 1999, Honma beat Wayne Turner in a kickboxing match at K-1 Survival '99. Honma would go on to lose at Pride 5 to Francisco Bueno by TKO. On April 14, 2000, Honma lost to Ron Waterman by decision at UFC 25. His final career fight was on July 4, 2004 against Ken Orihashi; the fight ended in a draw.

Mixed martial arts record

|-
| Draw
| align=center| 7-6-3
| Ken Orihashi
| Decision (unanimous)
| ZST - Battle Hazard 01
| 
| align=center| 1
| align=center| 5:00
| Tokyo, Japan
| 
|-
| Loss
| align=center| 7-6-2
| Ron Waterman
| Decision (unanimous)
| UFC 25
| 
| align=center| 3
| align=center| 5:00
| Yoyogi, Japan
| 
|-
| Loss
| align=center| 7-5-2
| Francisco Bueno
| TKO (strikes)
| Pride 5
| 
| align=center| 1
| align=center| 4:59
| Nagoya, Japan
| 
|-
| Win
| align=center| 7-4-2
| Naoki Sano
| TKO (strikes)
| Pride 4
| 
| align=center| 1
| align=center| 9:25
| Tokyo, Japan
| 
|-
| Loss
| align=center| 6-4-2
| Rene Rooze
| TKO (referee stoppage)
| K-1 Hercules
| 
| align=center| 1
| align=center| 2:48
| Nagoya, Japan
| 
|-
| Win
| align=center| 6-3-2
| Masayuki Naruse
| Decision
| RINGS - Rings in Yokohama
| 
| align=center| 1
| align=center| 30:00
| Yokohama, Japan
|
|-
| Win
| align=center| 5-3-2
| Fumio Akiyama
| TKO (knees)
| RINGS - Korakuen Experiment 5
| 
| align=center| 1
| align=center| n/a
| Tokyo, Japan
|
|-
| Win
| align=center| 4-3-2
| Yasunori Okuda
| Submission (heel hook)
| RINGS - Korakuen Experiment 4
| 
| align=center| 1
| align=center| 2:51
| Tokyo, Japan
| 
|-
| Draw
| align=center| 3-3-2
| Kenji Kawaguchi
| Draw
| Shooto - Shooto
| 
| align=center| 5
| align=center| 3:00
| Tokyo, Japan
| Kawaguchi fought to a draw with Honma to remain the Shooto Middleweight Champion.
|
|-
| Loss
| align=center| 3-3-1
| Manabu Yamada
| Submission (armbar)
| Shooto - Shooto
| 
| align=center| 3
| align=center| n/a
| Tokyo, Japan
| 
|-
| Loss
| align=center| 3-2-1
| Kenji Kawaguchi
| Decision
| Shooto - Shooto
| 
| align=center| 5
| align=center| 3:00
| Osaka, Japan
| Kawaguchi defeated Honma to remain the Shooto Middleweight Champion.
|
|-
| Win
| align=center| 3-1-1
| Manabu Yamada
| Submission (armbar)
| Shooto - Shooto
| 
| align=center| 4
| align=center| n/a
| Tokyo, Japan
| 
|-
| Win
| align=center| 2-1-1
| Yoshimasa Ishikawa
| Submission (armbar)
| Shooto - Shooto
| 
| align=center| 2
| align=center| n/a
| Tokyo, Japan
| 
|-
| Draw
| align=center| 1-1-1
| Takashi Tojo
| Draw
| Shooto - Shooto
| 
| align=center| 1
| align=center| n/a
| Tokyo, Japan
| 
|-
| Loss
| align=center| 1-1
| Kazuhiro Kusayanagi
| Submission (triangle choke)
| Shooto - Shooto
| 
| align=center| 1
| align=center| 1:17
| Tokyo, Japan
| 
|-
| Win
| align=center| 1-0
| Yutaka Fuji
| Submission (armbar)
| Shooto - Shooto
| 
| align=center| 2
| align=center| 2:36
| Tokyo, Japan
|-

Kickboxing record

|-
|Win
|1-0
| Wayne Turner
|TKO (3 Knockdowns)
|K-1 Survival '99
|June 6/1999
|3
|1:34
| Sapporo, Japan
|-

References

External links

1968 births
Living people
Japanese male mixed martial artists
Light heavyweight mixed martial artists
Mixed martial artists utilizing Seidokaikan
Japanese male kickboxers
Heavyweight kickboxers
Japanese male karateka
People from Niigata (city)
Ultimate Fighting Championship male fighters